Evergreen Cemetery may refer to the following cemeteries in the United States (listed by state, then city/town):

Alaska 
 Evergreen Cemetery (Juneau, Alaska)

Arizona 
 Evergreen Cemetery (Bisbee, Arizona), listed on the National Register of Historic Places (NRHP) in Cochise County, Arizona

Arkansas 
 Evergreen Cemetery (Fayetteville, Arkansas), listed on the NRHP in Washington County, Arkansas

California 
 Evergreen Cemetery (Los Angeles), California
 Evergreen Cemetery  (Oakland, California), site for the memorial plaque honoring the victims of the Jonestown Massacre
 Evergreen Cemetery (Riverside, California)
Evergreen Cemetery (Santa Cruz, California)

Colorado
 Evergreen Cemetery (Colorado Springs, Colorado), listed on the NRHP in El Paso County, Colorado
 Ute Cemetery, listed on the NRHP in Aspen, Colorado, and sometimes known as Evergreen Cemetery

Connecticut
 Evergreen Cemetery (New Haven, Connecticut)

Florida
 Evergreen Cemetery (Bartow, Florida)
 Evergreen Cemetery (Fort Lauderdale, Florida), a cemetery in Florida
 Evergreen Cemetery (Jacksonville, Florida), listed on the NRHP in Duval County, Florida
 Evergreen Cemetery (Ocala, Florida)

Illinois
 Evergreen Cemetery (Bloomington, Illinois)
 Evergreen Cemetery (Chester, Illinois), in Chester, Illinois

Kentucky

 Evergreen Cemetery (Southgate, Kentucky)

Maine
 Evergreen Cemetery in Houlton, Maine
 Evergreen Cemetery (Portland, Maine), listed on the NRHP in Cumberland County, Maine

Massachusetts
 Evergreen Cemetery (Boston, Massachusetts), listed on the NRHP in Suffolk County, Massachusetts
 Evergreen Cemetery (Medway, Massachusetts), listed on the NRHP in Norfolk County, Massachusetts

Michigan
 Evergreen Cemetery (Detroit, Michigan), a building on Woodward Avenue, Detroit

New Jersey
 Evergreen Cemetery (Hillside, New Jersey), listed on the NRHP in Union County, New Jersey
 Evergreen Cemetery (Morristown, New Jersey)

New York
 Evergreen Cemetery (Brooklyn, New York City)
 Evergreen Cemetery (Pine Plains, New York)
 White Store Church and Evergreen Cemetery, Norwich, New York, listed on the NRHP in Chenango County, New York
 Evergreen Cemetery (Owego, New York), listed on the NRHP in Tioga County, New York
 Evergreen Cemetery (Tannersville, New York)

Pennsylvania
 Evergreen Cemetery (Adams County, Pennsylvania)

Tennessee
 Evergreen Cemetery (Murfreesboro, Tennessee)

Vermont
 Evergreen Cemetery (Rutland, Vermont)

Virginia
 Evergreen Cemetery (Richmond, Virginia)

Washington
 Evergreen Cemetery (Everett, Washington), a cemetery containing a pyramid mausoleum 
 Evergreen Washelli Memorial Park, Seattle, Washington

Wisconsin
 Evergreen Cemetery (Menomonie, Wisconsin), listed on the NRHP in Dunn County, Wisconsin

See also
Evergreen Memorial Park (disambiguation)